Robin Currie was a New Zealander former cricket umpire. He stood in two Test matches between 1953 and 1955.

See also
 List of Test cricket umpires
 South African cricket team in New Zealand in 1952–53
 English cricket team in New Zealand in 1954–55

References

Year of birth missing
Possibly living people
Place of birth missing
New Zealand Test cricket umpires